UPL may refer to:

 UPL (company), a multinational agribusiness company formerly United Phosphorus Limited
 UPL Co., Ltd, video game production company
 Unauthorized practice of law, an act sometimes prohibited by statute, regulation, or court rules
 Ukrainian Premier League, highest division of Ukrainian football
 Uganda Premier League, highest division of Ugandan football
 University Press Limited, publishing company based in Dhaka, Bangladesh
 Free Patriotic Union, Tunisian political party
 Leonese People's Union, regional political party in Castile and León, Spain
 Ukko-Pekka Luukkonen, Finnish ice hockey goaltender